Hanson & Davis was an East Coast-based freestyle/dance-pop duo comprising session singers Aaron Hanson and Edward J. Davis. Although the group was not commercially successful as many similar freestyle musicians of the time (e.g. Lisa Lisa & Cult Jam or Miami Sound Machine), the group enjoyed popularity throughout clubs and urban radio stations.

Their début single was an freestyle and Chicago house-oriented song "Tonight (Love Will Make It Right)", which was edited by a house music producer Timmy Regisford. An initial success came after they released their next single "I'll Take You On / Hungry for Your Love / Hold on to Yesterday" the next year. The songs, known for fusing electro, freestyle and early house sounds, were written by Kurtis Mantronik and remixed by Larry Levan.

The duo disbanded shortly after their moderate club success with singles "Can't Stop" and "Come Together" in 1988.

Discography

Albums

Singles

Other singles
1985 "Tonight (Love Will Make It Right)" 
1996 "Free Love"

References 

Musical groups established in 1985
Musical groups from New York City
Electronic music groups from New York (state)
American rhythm and blues singers
American musical duos
American boogie musicians
American dance music groups
American garage house musicians
American synth-pop groups
American electro musicians
American freestyle music groups
Acid house groups
1985 establishments in New York City